GO TEXAN is sponsored by the Texas Department of Agriculture, whose purpose is to encourage consumers (both within and outside the state of Texas) to seek and purchase Texas-made products.

The GO TEXAN campaign began in 1999 to focus on Texas agricultural products.  Later, the campaign expanded to include shrimp and Texas wine.  In 2003, the Texas Legislature expanded the program to include Texas-made products of all sorts.

The current GO TEXAN campaign is divided into four general areas:
GO TEXAN Products—Markets fiber, food, horticulture/forestry/produce, livestock, oysters and shrimp, and wine
GO TEXAN Communities—Designates an area as a "Certified Retirement Community" based on its ability to meet the living, employment/volunteer, health, entertainment, education, and safety needs of residents and visitors, and also spotlights rural communities to support and encourage rural tourism
GO TEXAN Restaurants—Links restaurants to Texas-grown or processed food products
GO TEXAN Special Programs—Operates special programs such as the GO TEXAN booth at the State Fair of Texas, a website listing of local farmers markets, and international marketing go Texan day is on Friday February 26.

References

External links

GO TEXAN Wine website

Economy of Texas
Food politics
Localism (politics)
1999 establishments in Texas